There are shooting ranges in the United States open to the public, both indoor and outdoor.  Either privately owned firearms or those rented from the shooting range may be used, depending on the range rules set by the owner.  Some ranges rent their own handguns and provide instruction in use of rental guns at shooting ranges by a range master or similar individual to help one to easily learn use of any rental firearm in just a few minutes.  Major tourist destinations in gun-friendly U.S. States have such "rental ranges" to cater to the domestic and international tourists that want to try their hand at the shooting sports.  Each shooting range facility in the United States is typically overseen by one or more range masters to ensure gun safety rules are always stringently followed.

Specialized classes and licenses 
Typically, no license or advanced training beyond just firearm familiarization (for rentals) and range rules familiarization is usually required for using a shooting range in the United States; the only common requirement is that the shooter must be at least 18 years old (or have a legal guardian present), and must sign a waiver prior to shooting.

Self-defense classes may be available for a fee at shooting ranges, covering firearm use in much more detail.

Some ranges offer a class for concealed carry licenses, which are available in almost every state. Some states issue the license only after a short course, and in some courses are optional.

While most shooting ranges do not allow non US citizens to participate, many tourist oriented ranges offer rental firearms and safety lessons to foreign nationals. The rentals range from pistols and rifles all the way to full auto machine guns.

Locations 

In most states in the United States, there are numerous public-access shooting ranges, ranging for example from 144 in Florida with a population in excess of 18.2 million to 9 in Hawaii with a population of 1.3 million (numbers taken as of October 2008). Exceptions include cities in the states of Hawaii, California, Massachusetts, New York, New Jersey, Illinois, and Washington, DC, all known for gun control policies in general, where the numbers of ranges may be only one for every few hundred thousand people, or none at all, such as in the Washington, DC case.

Throughout much of the rest of the United States, though, especially in areas where the dominant side of the gun politics debate leans towards gun rights, and where no license is usually required to own a handgun or rifle or shotgun, the typical number of ranges often surpasses one for every 100,000 residents.

Of particular interest to international tourists interested in public access shooting ranges in the United States while on vacation, especially gun-friendly states include Kentucky, Tennessee, Florida, Alabama, Georgia, Virginia, New Hampshire, Arizona, Nevada, Colorado, and Utah, among others.  All of these states have publicly accessible shooting ranges with rental guns available at a modest fee. Ammunition costs for rental guns varies, of course, but 9×19mm Luger (usually the cheapest service caliber round) is often available for around $15 per 50 at sporting goods stores or slightly higher ($18–25) at most public access shooting ranges.

Private or restricted-access shooting ranges are owned and used by police departments, private companies, private membership shooting clubs, and the military for qualification and/or continued firearms practice and training. These private ranges have more-specialized features not seen in public ranges, e.g., large caliber rifle and automatic weapons ranges.

There are several types of shooting ranges, each catering to different classes of firearms, and meeting different needs. Some are inside buildings; others are outdoors and cover many acres.

Outdoor ranges
 On a shotgun or trap range, the shooter aims to hit sporting clays or skeet that are mechanically fired (or in some cases, thrown by hand) across an open field.  These involve shooting clay disks also known as clay pigeons thrown in various ways. Both skeet and trap are Olympic sports (or, more precisely, are disciplines of an Olympic sport that are contested in the Summer Olympics), and are practiced by many bird hunters to sharpen their marksmanship.
 On a rifle range, shooters typically fire at targets 100-300 yards (91–275 meters) or greater distance.  Many rifle ranges feature mechanized steel targets that automatically reset upon being hit.  Hunters in particular often use rifle ranges to calibrate or sight-in their rifles prior to hunting.
 On a handgun range, shooters fire semi-automatic pistols, revolvers, and sometimes pistol-caliber carbines or submachine guns at stationary targets along, or at the end of, a 15-100 yard (13-91 meter) long lane.

Most outdoor ranges have established strictly-followed procedures for ensuring that a range is either active ("hot") or inactive ("cold"). When everyone on the firing line agrees for the line to go hot, actions may be closed, magazines may be loaded, rounds may be chambered and firearms may be fired. When everyone on the firing line agrees for the line to go cold, magazines must be removed, firearms must be unloaded, actions opened, and all the firearms must be placed on tables. Only upon confirmation does the line actually go cold. Firearms may not be loaded or even touched when the line is cold.

Outdoor shooting ranges are usually backed by a sandbagged barrier or specially-designed funnel-shaped traps to prevent bullets from ricocheting back at the shooters. Many older outdoor ranges only use an earthen berm, which is often composed of sand, and called the impact berm. Most outdoor ranges restrict the maximum caliber size, or have separate ranges devoted to use with rifles firing heavy caliber cartridges.  Many outdoor ranges do permit the use of automatic weapons on specially adapted Class III weapons ranges.

The largest problem currently with outdoor ranges is the lack of sufficient area behind and beside the impact berms. This area, usually called the Surface Danger Zone (SDZ), is a fan-shaped area that extends lengthwise to the ultimate ballistic distance of the round fired. Outdoor ranges often use baffles to contain fired rounds within the range, and, with proper design can reduce the surface danger zone area. Guidelines for surface danger zones vary widely. The National Rifle Association maintains guidelines for range design, but often the U.S. military range design guidelines are more prescriptive, specific and easier to use.

Targets using Tannerite are sometimes used for indicating long-range markmanship accuracy at high power rifle and full-auto outdoor ranges. Tannerite is a binary explosive that is not exploded unless hit with high-velocity rounds. Most pistol rounds will not set it off.

Indoor ranges 
An estimated 16,000 to 18,000 indoor firing ranges are in operation in the United States. Indoor ranges differ in construction, depending on the type of weapons to be fired:
 On a rifle range, shooters typically fire pistol caliber carbines at targets 100 yards (91 meters) distant. The common practice is to follow rules much like those required on outdoor ranges.
 On a handgun range, shooters fire semi-automatic pistols, revolvers, and (sometimes) submachine guns at stationary targets along, or at the end of, a 15-100 yard (14-91 meter) long lane. Paper or cardboard targets are hung from a dummy or target holder positioned on a slide; this arrangement allows the shooter to control the shooting distance and retrieve targets for inspection. The target is typically hung from a replaceable hanger attached to a mechanized or motorized assembly that can be placed at varying distances from the shooter, by means of an electrical switch or manual pulley system. Common range shooting distances are 5 yards (4.5 meters) to 33 yards (23–30 meters). Most  ranges have minimum shooter-to-target distances, set by the range master, determined by safety considerations.

Fees for using indoor public shooting ranges vary widely with local costs, but a typical rate starts at $10 per hour of use, with targets available at a modest charge. Additional fees usually will pertain to damaging target hangers, lights or baffles, up to damaging motors, which may cost as much as $200, per incident. Unlike for outdoor ranges, or for indoor rifle ranges, indoor public handgun shooting ranges are usually run continuously "hot". The only exception is if a target falls from a holder and needs to be retrieved. In this rather rare scenario, some ranges will go "cold", after all firearms are placed on the firing line table with their actions open. Other ranges have a policy that no shooters may go forward of the firing line at any time, so the dropped target is considered lost and must be replaced.

Indoor ranges usually have a projectile trap consisting of curved or angled steel plates, shredded rubber, or specially packed and groomed sand, with reinforced baffles attached to the ceiling and walls. The most modern ranges additionally include anechoic chamber technology (foam wedges), or place other sound absorbing materials on walls, floors and ceilings for additional noise reduction. Such ranges also usually have an air-locked corridor for soundproofing, with doors at opposite ends of the corridor. Noise from the range is effectively contained as long as only one door is opened at a time; it is considered a breach of etiquette to open both doors simultaneously. Ventilation is designed to be sufficient in quantity and directional control to reduce concentrations of lead in the air to safe levels in the shooting area. A small group of high volume indoor ranges are now using lead-free and frangible ammunition to create a safer and healthier shooting experience for consumers.

The maximum caliber size is sometimes posted on the door of the airlock on each particular range, or in the lobby or ready area if the facility only contains one range. Most indoor ranges restrict the use of certain magnum calibers, or the use of automatic weapons, primarily to prevent damage to the facilities. Other ranges do not have a caliber restriction, but instead limit projectiles to a certain muzzle velocity, often 2000 feet per second, or bullet construction.

Common safety practices 

Nearly all public ranges require that all firearms be unloaded prior to entering, or leaving, the range facility, irrespective of whether one holds a concealed carry license.  The same is true for rental firearms leaving or returning to the rental counter, going to and from the shooting range.

Whether indoors or outdoors, all shooters are required to wear safety glasses or goggles, although some ranges will allow impact-resistant corrective glasses as the only eye protection.  Ear protection is mandatory either ear muffs or ear plugs, as long as one is within the defined boundaries of the range and the range is hot. For indoor ranges, these must be donned before going through the air lock door, and kept on as long as individuals are within the high noise area. Indoor ranges can introduce the risk of lead poisoning if they are not ventilated or cleaned properly. Lead dust in these facilities can be inhaled or can contaminate skin and clothing.

The instructions of the appointed range master are to be followed at all times.

Holster drawing, cowboy action shooting and combat-style shooting are not generally allowed, except on specially designated action shooting ranges, which often have additional safety requirements and equipment.  Regular public ranges that do allow such shooting usually restrict the practice to designated persons, such as Law Enforcement, professional shooters, or others designated by range personnel.

Cost of shooting 
If one brings one's own firearms, ear and eye protection, it is often possible to buy a 50-round box of 9 mm ammunition and target, rent an indoor lane for an hour, and enjoy shooting for under $50 in the United States. Fees for outdoor ranges are often even less, often running $6.50 for 3 hours of range time. Along with a 500-round brick of .22 LR ammunition that often costs less than $60, it is possible on an outdoor range to enjoy an afternoon of shooting for under $70. Firearm rental fees vary, depending on the model and caliber, but for a typical, non-exotic handgun, costs are only modestly higher. Hearing and eye protection rental fees are modest, often available for under $3 each.

Shooting ranges that cater to foreign tourists interested in shooting handguns may have special package deals for under $20 for instruction, assistance, and shooting.  Larger caliber firearms and automatic weapons are available for tourists at some ranges as well. Fees for renting larger caliber firearms are only modestly more, but rental fees for automatic weapons can rise quickly, to hundreds of dollars, depending on the number of rounds fired.

For those interested in more heavy use of the local shooting range, annual memberships are available at many indoor U.S. shooting ranges. Both individual and family memberships are often available.  Typical costs vary but annual membership is usually available for around $200 per person, or slightly more for an entire family.  Such plans typically have unlimited usage of the range, unlike the typical 1/2 hour or 1-, 2-, or 3-hour rental time slots when renting a shooting lane as an occasional shooter.  For anyone shooting more than 8-10 times a year, annual membership is often cheaper than paying an hourly rate.  For the more exotic outdoor sporting club private ranges, annual membership in the NRA is usually mandatory.

It is worth noting that there are many unsupervised outdoor ranges on public land in the U.S. where shooting is free and unfettered.

See also 
Shooting ranges in Norway
Shooting ranges in Switzerland
Shooting sports
Gun politics in the United States
Schützenverein

References

External links
 Health and Safety: Indoor Firing Ranges. National Institute for Occupational Safety and Health.
 https://www.epa.gov/lead/best-management-practices-lead-outdoor-shooting-ranges

 
United States

sl:Strelišče